Geir Sigurd Karlsen (born 18 September 1948) is a retired Norwegian football goalkeeper.

Geir Karlsen's first club was Skidar, a local club in Skien, Norway.  He made his debut for Odd in 1966, and stayed there until he joined Rosenborg BK in 1970. He won one cap with Norway while playing for Odd, and was capped 32 times in total. In 1980, he returned to Odd after spells with Dunfermline Athletic and Vålerengen. 

He retired as a player in 1984.

References

1948 births
Living people
Norwegian footballers
Norway international footballers
Odds BK players
Rosenborg BK players
Vålerenga Fotball players
Dunfermline Athletic F.C. players
Norwegian expatriate footballers
Expatriate footballers in Scotland
Norwegian expatriate sportspeople in Scotland
Sportspeople from Skien

Association football goalkeepers